Blue movie or Blue film may refer to:

Film
 A term for pornographic films
 Blue Movie, a 1969 film by Andy Warhol, beginning Golden Age of Porn
 Blue Movie (1971 film), a 1971 film by Wim Verstappen
 Blue Movie, a 1989 pornographic mockumentary film directed by Jack Remy
 Blue (1968 film), a 1968 Western film by Silvio Narizzano
 Blue (1993 film), a 1993 film by Derek Jarman
 Blue (2002 film), a 2001 Japanese film by Hiroshi Ando
 Blue (2009 film), a 2009 Bollywood film by Anthony D'Souza

Books
 Blue Movie (1970 book), a 1970 book of the 1969 Andy Warhol film
 Blue Movie (novel), a 1970 novel by Terry Southern
 "The Blue Film", a 1954 short story by the English novelist Graham Greene

Music
 Blue Film (album), an album by Lo-Fang
 "Blue Movie", a 2014 song by Lowtide from their eponymous debut album
 "Blue-film Movie", a 2002 song by Sneaker Pimps from Bloodsport

See also